"Nancy Mulligan" is a song by English singer-songwriter Ed Sheeran. It was included on the deluxe edition of his third studio album ÷ (2017) and is the fifteenth track. After the album's release it charted at number 13 on the UK Singles Chart. Sheeran recorded the song together with  Beoga.

Background
"Nancy Mulligan" is one of the most personal songs on the album, telling the story of how his grandparents, William Sheeran, a Protestant from Belfast, Northern Ireland and Anne "Nancy" Mulligan, a Catholic from the Republic of Ireland, met, fell in love during the Second World War and got married at the Wexford border. Sheeran said: "They got engaged and no one turned up at their wedding. He stole all the gold teeth in his dental surgery and melted them down into a wedding ring, and they wore borrowed clothes to get married, and just basically have this kind of Romeo and Juliet romance, which is like the most romantic thing. So I thought I'd write a song about it and make it a jig [reel]."

In an interview with the Irish Times, talking about the song's Irish roots, Sheeran said "I don't think enough people use Irish folk in pop music... Hopefully if these songs are successful, more people will do a bit more like it."

Notable performances and covers
In 2017, the song was covered by the Irish country singer Mike Denver with an accompanying music video.

Sheeran performed the song, backed on stage by Beoga, during his headline performance at the Glastonbury Festival 2017.

Charts and certifications

Weekly charts

Certifications

References

2017 songs
Ed Sheeran songs
Songs written by Ed Sheeran
Songs written by Amy Wadge
Songs written by Johnny McDaid
Songs written by Foy Vance
Songs written by Benny Blanco
Song recordings produced by Benny Blanco